Libum or Libon was a town of ancient Bithynia, on the road from Nicomedia to Nicaea.

Its site is located near Senaiye, in Asiatic Turkey.

References

Populated places in Bithynia
Former populated places in Turkey
History of Kocaeli Province